Bear's Retreat is a small Pennsylvania landmark, primarily known for its age. 

It is a privately owned house dating back to c. 1794, being lived in as of 2011.  The southern log side was built by Jacob Bare in 1794.  It is believed he was a German immigrant based on the three-story construction of the log section. Despite plenty of room to build his home, large, heavy, hand-hewn logs were raised higher and higher into place in the traditional building custom of his homeland.  The Northern "new addition" brick side built in 1840.  The red-brick exterior was made on-site using the abundant clay found on the property.  Remains of the outdoor summer kitchen are still clearly present.  The property was designated a Pittsburgh History and Landmarks Foundation Historic Landmark in 1983.
Bear's Retreat is at 253 Inglefield Drive, Pleasant Hills, Pennsylvania.

External links
 Pittsburgh History and Landmarks Foundation's Historic Landmarks Plaques, page 12, designated 1983
 

Pittsburgh History & Landmarks Foundation Historic Landmarks
Houses in Allegheny County, Pennsylvania
1790s establishments in Pennsylvania